Bellush is a surname. Notable people with the surname include: 

Bernard Bellush (1917–2011), American historian and journalist
Murder of Sheila Bellush, 35-year-old mother of six who was murdered in 1997

See also
 Bellús